Kade Kolodjashnij ("collar-JAZZ-knee"; born 9 August 1995) is a former Australian rules footballer who played for the Gold Coast Suns and Melbourne Football Club in the Australian Football League (AFL).

Early life
Kolodjashnij grew up in Tasmania where he played soccer and basketball in his younger years. His grandparents fled the Soviet controlled Ukraine after World War II and settled in Australia. Kolodjashnij's twin brother Jake also plays football professionally for the Geelong Cats.

He attended St Patrick's College, Launceston.

Junior football
Kolodjashnij began playing Australian football for the first time at 12 years of age for the Prospect Junior Football Club. Kolodjashnij lived across the road from Prospect Park a multi-user venue for both soccer and Australian football.  He and brother Jake played in junior premierships for Prospect in U13s and U14s of the Northern Tasmanian Junior Football Association. In his U15 season with Prospect he and Jake were referred to Tasmanian Head Coach, and ex-AFL player, Mathew Armstrong, for consideration for the Tasmanian Talented Player Pathway and were duly recognised as having significant potential. As part of the talented player pathway process, both the Kolodjashnij brothers were permitted to Tasmanian State League Club, Launceston, for their U16 year. Kade played for Tasmania in the Under 16 National Championship in 2011 and followed that with selection in the U18 National Championships in both 2012 and 2013 and was considered a top 5 prospect leading into the 2013 AFL Draft. He was taken with the 5th pick in the 2013 draft by the Gold Coast Football Club.

AFL career
Kolodjashnij made his AFL debut against Fremantle in Round 2 of the 2014 season.
From his first games it was apparent that Kolodjashnij was coping well with the pace and requirements of AFL football.  In Round 10 of his debut season he secured a nomination for the AFL/NAB Rising Star for 2014.

After the 2020 season, Kolodjashnij retired from football due to concussion issues.

Personal life
Kolodjashnij currently studies a Bachelor of Commerce at Deakin University.

Statistics
Statistics are correct to the end of the 2019 season

|- style="background:#EAEAEA"
| scope="row" text-align:center | 2014
| 
| 28 || 18 || 5 || 3 || 192 || 116 || 308 || 88 || 34 || 0.3 || 0.2 || 10.7 || 6.4 || 17.1 || 4.9 || 1.9
|-
| scope="row" text-align:center | 2015
| 
| 28 || 22 || 5 || 1 || 320 || 170 || 490 || 124 || 42 || 0.2 || 0.0 || 14.5 || 7.7 || 22.3 || 5.6 || 1.9
|- style="background:#EAEAEA"
| scope="row" text-align:center | 2016
| 
| 28 || 19 || 0 || 1 || 210 || 123 || 333 || 114 || 45 || 0.0 || 0.1 || 11.1 || 6.5 || 17.5 || 6.0 || 2.4
|-
| scope="row" text-align:center | 2017
| 
| 10 || 11 || 3 || 0 || 138 || 94 || 232 || 83 || 24 || 0.3 || 0.0 || 12.5 || 8.5 || 21.1 || 7.5 || 2.2
|- style="background:#EAEAEA"
| scope="row" text-align:center | 2018
| 
| 10 || 8 || 0 || 2 || 97 || 33 || 130 || 44 || 15 || 0.0 || 0.3 || 12.1 || 4.1 || 16.3 || 5.5 || 1.9
|-
| scope="row" text-align:center | 2019
| 
| 16 || 2 || 1 || 0 || 10 || 7 || 17 || 7 || 6 || 0.5 || 0.0 || 5.0 || 3.5 || 8.5 || 3.5 || 3.0
|- style="background:#EAEAEA; font-weight:bold; width:2em"
| scope="row" text-align:center class="sortbottom" colspan=3 | Career
| 80
| 14
| 7
| 967
| 543
| 1510
| 460
| 166
| 0.2
| 0.1
| 12.1
| 6.8
| 18.9
| 5.8
| 2.1
|}

References

External links

1995 births
Australian people of Ukrainian descent
Australian rules footballers from Tasmania
Gold Coast Football Club players
Launceston Football Club players
Living people
Melbourne Football Club players
Casey Demons players
Twin sportspeople